Álvaro Lemos Collazo (born 30 March 1993) is a Spanish professional footballer who plays for Las Palmas as a right winger.

Club career
Born in Santiago de Compostela, Galicia, Lemos joined Deportivo de La Coruña's youth setup in 2005 at the age of 12, after starting out at SD Villestro. He made his senior debuts with the former's reserves in 2011, in Tercera División.

In July 2013, after making the pre-season with the first team, Lemos suffered a serious knee injury, only returning to the fields in March of the following year. On 21 July 2014 he was loaned to Segunda División B club SD Compostela, for one year.

Lemos struggled with injuries during his time at Compos, appearing in just 19 competitive games. On 17 July 2015, he signed with CD Lugo from Segunda División after agreeing to a three-year deal.

On 9 September 2015, Lemos played his first professional match, coming on as a second-half substitute for David Ferreiro in a 1–0 away win against Córdoba CF for the season's Copa del Rey. On 27 January of the following year he was handed a professional contract, being assigned the  14 jersey.

On 5 July 2016, Lemos moved to La Liga side Celta de Vigo for five years. He first appeared in the competition the following 28 January, starting and scoring the first goal in a 2–0 success at CD Leganés, where he had already made his professional debut with his previous team.

On 10 January 2018, after a six-month loan spell at RC Lens, Lemos returned to Lugo also in a temporary deal. On 19 June, he signed a three-year contract with UD Las Palmas.

References

External links

1993 births
Living people
Spanish footballers
Footballers from Santiago de Compostela
Association football defenders
Association football wingers
Association football utility players
Segunda División players
Segunda División B players
Tercera División players
Deportivo Fabril players
SD Compostela footballers
CD Lugo players
RC Celta de Vigo players
UD Las Palmas players
Ligue 2 players
RC Lens players
Spanish expatriate footballers
Expatriate footballers in France
Spanish expatriate sportspeople in France
La Liga players